Thomas Leuthard (born 5 October 1971) is a Swiss photographer who specializes in street photography.

Personal life 
Thomas Leuthard started photography in early 2008, and in May 2009 he decided to shoot street photography only. He travels to the big cities to witness and document life on the street.

In June 2017, he decided to quit photography due to motivational reasons.

Exhibitions 
 2010 "Street Fotografie", Finke Wohnwelt, Paderborner Fototage, Germany
 2011 „Strangers“, Photo Münsingen, Switzerland
 2013 „A Mirror to Society", Photo Münsingen, Switzerland

Publications 
 2011 Going Candid, eBook
 2011 Collecting Souls, eBook
 2012 Street Faces, eBook
 2013 Seelenraub, eBook (German)
 2013 Explore Flickr, eBook

References

External links 
 Website of Thomas Leuthard
 Illustrations of Thomas Leuthard
 Commons: Thomas Leuthard – Collection of photos
 Olympus Visionaries – Thomas Leuthard
 2014 Streethunters, The 10 most influential active street photographers
 2014 LensPeople, An Interview with Street Photographer Thomas Leuthard
 2014 Street Photography London, Thomas Leuthard – Street Photography Interview
 2015 Critique Portfolio Pro, Artist Interview – Thomas Leuthard
 2015 Streethunters, The 20 most influential street photographers

Street photographers
1971 births
Living people
Swiss photographers
Swiss contemporary artists
People from Zug